Sibley is a town in south Webster Parish, Louisiana, United States. The population was 1,218 at the 2010 census. It is part of the Minden Micropolitan Statistical Area.

Community highlights

The former Sibley High School, now known as Lakeside Junior and Senior High School, is located south of town off Louisiana Highway 7. The Sibley Town Hall was relocated to a portion of the former Sibley High School campus.

In a predominantly African American section of Yellow Pine is a community formerly known as "King Solomon Hill," centered on an actual hill on which stood King Solomon Hill Baptist Church. (The community is now known as "Salt Works.") The blues historian Gayle Dean Wardlow concluded that it was from this address that  Paramount Records chose to give the blues musician Joe Holmes, a resident of Sibley, the recording name of King Solomon Hill.

Geography
Sibley is located at  (32.540704, -93.293208).

According to the United States Census Bureau, the town has a total area of 4.0 square miles (10.4 km), of which 3.9 square miles (10.0 km) is land and 0.1 square mile (0.4 km) (3.49%) is water.

Demographics

2020 census

As of the 2020 United States census, there were 1,127 people, 554 households, and 396 families residing in the town.

2000 census
As of the census of 2000, there were 1,098 people, 412 households, and 315 families residing in the town. The racial makeup of the town was 74.95% White, 23.59% African American, 0.46% Native American, 0.18% from other races, and 0.82% from two or more races. Hispanic or Latino of any race were 0.55% of the population.

There were 412 households, out of which 35.7% had children under the age of 18 living with them, 55.1% were married couples living together, 18.0% had a female householder with no husband present, and 23.5% were non-families. 20.9% of all households were made up of individuals, and 10.4% had someone living alone who was 65 years of age or older. The average household size was 2.66 and the average family size was 3.06.

In the town, the population was spread out, with 27.9% under the age of 18, 8.7% from 18 to 24, 26.1% from 25 to 44, 24.0% from 45 to 64, and 13.2% who were 65 years of age or older. The median age was 37 years. For every 100 females, there were 91.3 males. For every 100 females age 18 and over, there were 89.9 males.

The median income for a household in the town was $28,816, and the median income for a family was $34,479. Males had a median income of $34,750 versus $17,750 for females. The per capita income for the town was $13,749. About 14.4% of families and 21.4% of the population were below the poverty line, including 29.3% of those under age 18 and 22.1% of those age 65 or over.

Notable people
Provine Bradley (1907-1986), Negro league baseball player

References

External links

 

Towns in Louisiana
Towns in Webster Parish, Louisiana